The Israeli ambassador in Beijing is the official representative of the Government in Jerusalem to the Government of the People's Republic of China.

Background
Israel was the first country in the Middle East to recognize the PRC as the legitimate government of China. However, China did not establish normal diplomatic relations with Israel until 1992. Since then, Israel and China have developed increasingly close strategic economic, military and technological links with each other. Israel maintains an embassy in Beijing and consulates in Shanghai, Guangzhou, Chengdu and Hong Kong.

List of representatives
 Zev Sufott (זאב סופות) (1992–1993)
 Moshe Ben-Yaacov (משה בן-יעקב) (1993–1996)
 Ora Namir (אורה נמיר) (1996–2000)
 Itzhak Shelef (יצחק שלף) (2000–2002)
 Yehoyada Haim (יהוידע חיים) (2002–2007)  
 Amos Nadai (עמוס נדאי) (2007–2011)
 Matan Vilnai (מתן וילנאי) (2011–2017)
 Zvi Heifetz (2021-2017)

See also
 China–Israel relations

References 

 
China
Israel